Smash Television is a Maltese television station. Smash is privately owned and maintains a neutral editorial position in which different opinions on Maltese politics are expressed. It remains much smaller than the older stations.

See also
Television in Malta

References

External links
 

Television stations in Malta
1994 establishments in Malta
Television channels and stations established in 1994